"Hard Time Loving You" is a song recorded by Canadian country music artist Julian Austin. It was released in 1998 as the fifth single from his debut album, What My Heart Already Knows. It peaked at number 13 on the RPM Country Tracks chart in October 1998.

Chart performance

Year-end charts

References

1997 songs
1998 singles
Julian Austin (musician) songs
Songs written by Julian Austin (musician)
ViK. Recordings singles